Roxanne McKee (born 10 August 1980) is a British actress and model. She is best known for playing Louise Summers in the British soap opera Hollyoaks (2005–2008), Lou Foster in the British drama series Lip Service (2010), Doreah in the American fantasy drama series Game of Thrones (2011–2012) and Lady Claire Riesen in the American apocalyptic supernatural series Dominion (2014–2015). She has also starred in films including Wrong Turn 5: Bloodlines (2012), Vendetta (2013) and The Legend of Hercules (2014).

Early life and education
McKee was born in Canada to Irish parents and completed a BA degree in Social Policy & Political Studies at Royal Holloway, University of London in 2005.

Career

Hollyoaks
McKee auditioned for the role of Hollyoaks character Louise Summers in 2004 as part of Hollyoaks: On the Pull, a nationwide search to find a new actor. After being chosen from over 35,000 applicants, McKee began portraying Louise, who was introduced by series producer David Hanson in 2005.

In 2008, McKee hinted at a possible exit for her character, despite refusing claims that she wanted to leave. She told Look magazine: "I'm not going to be there forever. I don't mind the long hours but I'll have been doing that for four years in October when my contract ends." After her contract ended in October 2008, McKee decided to leave the show in order to focus on other projects, mainly theatre. Several months after her final on-screen appearance, tabloid newspapers began to speculate that McKee would reprise the role to coincide with the exit of Jamie Lomas's character, Warren. McKee had previously told Digital Spy: "Well, Louise might not be dead! That's the exciting twist in the future....On screen, you'll feel like she's dead but depending on me and whether I want to come back for an episode in March — I might be back. I filmed an extra scene showing that I'm still alive. There are flashbacks which show me being killed, but then there's a flashback which viewers won't see for a while, that will be used if I choose to come back for the episode. I kind of want to come back and finish off Louise's storyline, but at the moment, I might be doing something else. It would be really good, though — I'd be going back to kill a few people off."

Following McKee's decision to leave the show, she said: "I have enjoyed my time at Hollyoaks immensely and I'm going to really miss everyone at Lime Pictures. I have learned so much and will take away with me many happy memories — not just from everyone I have worked with but from Liverpool as a city too, which has become my second home. I know I will shed a few tears on the day I leave but I am so excited about what the future holds." Hollyoaks series producer Bryan Kirkwood commented on her departure, stating: "As well as being the nation's sexiest soap star for two years running, Roxanne has worked incredibly hard to prove herself as a talented actress. She has been at the centre of one of our biggest storylines for the past two years and her exit scenes will be a fitting climax. Roxanne is a real star in the making and I'm sure this won't be the last that we hear of her." McKee won the award 'Sexiest Female' at The British Soap Awards in 2007 and 2008, an award she had been nominated for in 2006 and 2009. McKee was also won 'Sexiest Female' at the Inside Soap Awards in 2007 and 2008. In 2008 she was also nominated for 'Best Actress'.

Virgin Media profiled some of Hollyoaks "hottest females" in their opinion, of Louise they stated: "It's no surprise that sultry Roxanne McKee was voted sexiest soap star for two years running at the British Soap Awards. She's so foxy that even on-screen fiancé Warren was sad he had to finish her off."

Subsequent roles
In 2008, McKee appeared in the Taio Cruz music video for "She's like a Star". The following year, McKee filmed parts in Johannes Roberts' hooligan horror film F and BBC Two's The Persuasionists.

In July 2009, McKee became the face of Clothes Show Live, stating: "I've always watched it on TV and wanted to go, so I'm very flattered to be part of such a huge event". In 2010, she was cast in a small role in on-line drama EastEnders: E20, playing bisexual character Pippa.

McKee acted in the modern lesbian drama Lip Service for BBC Three set in Glasgow, McKee would later play the part of a new character, Doreah in Game of Thrones, an HBO series based on the best-selling epic fantasy series of novels written by George RR Martin.

In May 2012, McKee was announced as being part of the horror sequel Wrong Turn 5: Bloodlines.

Personal life

As of 2017, McKee lives in Los Angeles.

Filmography

Film

Television

Awards and nominations
2006
 No. 91 in the FHM 100 Sexiest Women in the World.

2007
 Won at British Soap Awards in category of Sexiest Female for her role in Hollyoaks.
 Won at Inside Soap Award in category of Sexiest Female for her role in Hollyoaks.
 No. 42 in the FHM 100 Sexiest Women in the World.

2008
 Won at Digital Spy Soap Awards in category of Sexiest Female for her role in Hollyoaks.
 No. 97 in the FHM 100 Sexiest Women in the World.
 Won at British Soap Awards in category of Sexiest Female for her role in Hollyoaks.

References

External links
 
 Profile, whatsontv.co.uk

Living people
People from Lewisham
Actresses from London
Alumni of Royal Holloway, University of London
British television actresses
British soap opera actresses
Canadian television actresses
People educated at Our Lady of Sion School
21st-century English actresses
English soap opera actresses
1980 births
Canadian people of Irish descent
British people of Irish descent